Am Dabs (also Romanized as Ām Dabs) is a village in Bostan Rural District, Bostan District, Dasht-e Azadegan County, Khuzestan Province, Iran. At the 2006 census, its population was 631, in 80 families.

References 

Populated places in Dasht-e Azadegan County